Dawn N. Ward, Ph.D. is a synthetic organic chemist and associate professor in chemistry at Stevenson University.

Background and career 
Ward grew up in Baltimore, Maryland and graduated from Woodlawn High School. After receiving her BA in chemistry from Lincoln University, she worked in multiple chemical industry positions and was a public schoolteacher. Ward returned to the University of Maryland, Baltimore County for her Ph.D. in 2003, receiving it in 2009. Ward 's research group at Stevenson researches potent Heterocyclic amine-based Helicase inhibitors of Hepatitis C.

Community work and volunteering 
Ward works to promote racial diversity in STEM fields through the Ingenuity Project. She is on the Board of Advisors for the Black Girls Dive Foundation.

Awards and honors 

 Meyerhoff Graduate Fellow, 2009

References 

Living people
People from Baltimore
American chemists
American women chemists
Year of birth missing (living people)
21st-century American women